Arrivano i nostri is a 1951 Italian comedy film directed by Mario Mattoli and starring Mario Riva.

Cast
 Mario Riva
 Riccardo Billi as The showman playing Carmen Miranda
 Franca Marzi as Gloria Chelli — Garlandi's lover
 Lisetta Nava as Lisetta Rapelli
 Nyta Dover as Acrobat and circus owner's wife
 Alberto Sorrentino
 Giuseppe Porelli as Baron Rapelli
 Carlo Romano as Garlandi
 Gianni Cavalieri
 Gino Cavalieri
 Guglielmo Inglese
 Franco Sportelli
 Giacomo Furia

External links

1951 films
1951 comedy films
Commedia all'italiana
1950s Italian-language films
Italian black-and-white films
Films directed by Mario Mattoli
Italian comedy films
1950s Italian films